Shawano Municipal Airport  is a city and county-owned public-use airport located one nautical mile (2 km) northeast of the central business district of Shawano, a city in Shawano County, Wisconsin, United States. It is included in the Federal Aviation Administration (FAA) National Plan of Integrated Airport Systems for 2021–2025, in which it is categorized as a local general aviation facility. The airport is located on Shawano Lake and has a landing area for seaplanes.

Although many U.S. airports use the same three-letter location identifier for the FAA and IATA, this facility is assigned EZS by the FAA but has no designation from the IATA (which assigned EZS to Elazığ Airport in Elazığ, Turkey).

Facilities and aircraft 
Shawano Municipal Airport covers an area of 342 acres (138 ha) at an elevation of 813 feet (248 m) above mean sea level. It has two asphalt paved runways: 12/30 is 3,899 by 75 feet (1,188 x 23 m) and 17/35 is 2,225 by 60 feet (678 x 18 m). The airport also has one seaplane landing area measuring 12,000 by 1,000 feet (3,658 x 305 m).

For the 12-month period ending June 24, 2020, the airport had 12,700 aircraft operations, an average of 35 per day: 96% general aviation, 2% air taxi and 2% military. In January 2023, there were 26 aircraft based at this airport: all 26 single-engine.

See also 
 List of airports in Wisconsin

References

External links 
 https://shawanoairport.com/
 Shawano Flying Service, the fixed-base operator (FBO)
  at Wisconsin DOT Airport Directory
 

Airports in Wisconsin
Seaplane bases in the United States
Buildings and structures in Shawano County, Wisconsin